N,N-Diallyltryptamine (DALT) is a tryptamine derivative which has been identified as a new psychoactive substance.  It has been used as an intermediate in the preparation of radiolabeled diethyltryptamine.

One of the more pronounced effects of this substance is a sharp increase in body temperature, similar to the effects of 2,4-Dinitrophenol (DNP). Unlike DNP, DALT is suggested to be safer, as it belongs to the tryptamine family. DALT exhibits weak psychoactive properties, particularly among tryptamines.  
The metabolic effects of this substance on body temperature, and its non-toxic nature, leads to the viability of this substance being used for emergency situations in cold weather environments, or as a weight loss supplement.

See also 
 4-AcO-DALT
 5-MeO-DALT

References 

Psychedelic tryptamines
Designer drugs
Entheogens
Allyl compounds